Jodo-myeon is a myeon (township) in Jindo County of South Jeolla Province, South Korea. The township office is in Changyu-ri on Hajodo (Hajo Island).

There are 177 islands (36 inhabited and 141 uninhabited islands) on the sea off Jodo-myeon. It is the thickest cluster of islands in Korea. Jodogundo or Jodo archipelagoes, the six archipelagoes of Jodo, include Gasa archipelago, Seongnam archipelago, Sangjo archipelago, Geocha archipelago, Gwanmae archipelago, and Hajo archipelago.

Administrative divisions 
Jodo-myeon is divided into 23 villages (ri).

Jodo archipelagoes
Gasagundo (Gasa archipelago, 가사군도): Gasado, Daesodongdo, Jujido, Yangdeokdo, Hyeoldo, Songdo, Gwangdaedo
Seongnamgundo (Seongnam archipelago, 성남군도): Seongnamdo, Soseongnamdo, Okdo, Baegyado, Yugeumdo, Naebyeongdo, Oebyeongdo
Sangjogundo (Upper Jodo archipelago, 상조군도): Sangjodo
Hajogundo (Lower Jodo archipelago, 하조군도): Hajodo
Dokgeogundo (Dokgeo archipelago, 독거군도): Dokgeodo, Seuldo, Gudo
Gwanmaegundo (Gwanmae archipelago, 관매군도): Gwanmaedo, Cheongdeungdo
Geochagundo (Geocha archipelago, 거차군도): Donggeochado, Mangdo, Bukdo, Sangsongdo, Hasongdo, Songdo, Seogeochado, Sangjukdo, Hajukdo, Hangdo
Maenggolgundo (Maenggol archipelago, 맹골군도): Maenggoldo, Gwakdo, Myeongdo, Mongdeokdo, Sojukdo, Jukdo

References

External links 
  

Jindo County
Towns and townships in South Jeolla Province
Archipelagoes of South Korea